Matoupu is a township-level division of Xinle City, Shijiazhuang, Hebei, China.
The Shijiazhuang Zhengding International Airport is located next to the town.

See also
List of township-level divisions of Hebei

References

Township-level divisions of Hebei